Veit Heinichen (born 1957, in Villingen-Schwenningen) is a German novelist.

Heinichen studied economics at Stuttgart University, and then worked in publishing. He remained a director until 1999.

Heinichen writes noir novels featuring Commissario Proteo Laurenti as main character. Like his protagonist, he currently lives in Trieste.

Works
Currently the novels of Veit Heinichen are available in 10 different languages. English is not yet one of them. Here is a list of the original works:
 Gib jedem seinen eigenen Tod. Zsolnay, Wien 2001
 Die Toten vom Karst. Zsolnay, Wien 2002
 Tod auf der Warteliste. Zsolnay, Wien 2003
 Der Tod wirft lange Schatten. Zsolnay, Wien 2005
 Triest, Stadt der Winde. Sanssouci, München 2005
 Totentanz. Zsolnay, Wien 2007
 Die Ruhe des Stärkeren. Zsolnay, Wien 2009
 Keine Frage des Geschmacks. Zsolnay, Wien 2011
 Im eigenen Schatten. Zsolnay, Wien 2013
The first four novels plus Totentanz were filmed for the German ARD television series Commissario Laurenti (2006–2009).

In 2014 he acted with the part of a writer in the film-comedy Sexy Shop.

References

External links
  

German crime fiction writers
German publishers (people)
People from Villingen-Schwenningen
1957 births
Living people
German male novelists